Martín Vázquez is a Spanish former sprint canoer who competed in the mid to late 1970s. He won two bronze medals at the ICF Canoe Sprint World Championships, earning them in 1975 (K-1 4 x 500 m) and in 1977 (K-4 500 m).

References

Living people
Spanish male canoeists
Year of birth missing (living people)
ICF Canoe Sprint World Championships medalists in kayak
20th-century Spanish people